Spider-Man: The Video Game, also known as  is a 1991 arcade video game developed by Sega based on the Marvel Comics character Spider-Man.

Plot
Spider-Man and his allies must retrieve a mystical artifact first from the Kingpin, then Doctor Doom.

Gameplay

The game was released as a coin-operated arcade title based on the Sega System 32 hardware. The game can be played as a single player game or up to a four players cooperatively. Each character can do a special move related to their super power which reduces their health.

During levels the game changes from a side-scrolling beat 'em up into a platform game as the camera zooms to a far-away view of the characters in miniature. Later it zooms back in for the much larger and more detailed characters to continue the brawling.

The game was divided into four acts, meeting various villains, including Kingpin, Venom and his symbiote clones, Doctor Octopus, Electro, Lizard, Scorpion, Sandman, Green Goblin, Hobgoblin, and finally Doctor Doom. High scores are separated by character; so a high score on Spider-Man may not be a high score on Hawkeye or Black Cat.

Spider-Man: The Video Game's soundtrack is also partially comprised from tunes from Sega's 1986 arcade game Quartet, notably the tunes "Oki Rap" and "FM Funk" (for instance, "FM Funk" appears in the second stage in Spider-Man, while it is featured in the third stage of Quartet).

Characters
The game allows the user to play as one of four heroes: Spider-Man, Black Cat, Sub-Mariner, and Hawkeye. Unlike many games of this type which assigned a certain character to a certain joystick, any player can choose any character (as long as another player isn't already controlling them).

Each hero has a unique set of moves and attacks/abilities, which could be used to beat up the bad guys, that suited their powers and characteristics, as well as basic attacks and jumps (assigned to each of the two buttons).

Spider-Man
Spider-Man is the game's main hero and protagonist of the game, as well as one of four playable characters. Spider-Man's move list and attacks consist primarily of moves which revolve around his web-based spider powers, such as swinging from webs and shooting webbing blasts.

Black Cat
Black Cat is one of the other three playable characters. Athletic and acrobatic like a cat, Black Cat uses a combination of her claws, grappling hook and cables to defeat enemies throughout the game.

Hawkeye
Recognizable as one of the Avengers, Hawkeye is the third character in the game out of the four playable heroes. As evident by his weapon of choice, the bow and arrow, Hawkeye's attacks and abilities revolve around the use of his bow in order to defeat the enemies of the game.

Sub-Mariner
Being a citizen of Atlantis, Sub-Mariner uses water based projectile attacks (such as a hydro-electric blast) in order to help him defeat enemies throughout the game.

Development
Spider-Man: The Video Game was showcased at the 1991 Las Vegas Amusement Expo.

Reception
In Japan, Game Machine listed Spider-Man on their November 1, 1991 issue as being the fourteenth most-successful table arcade unit of the month. In the United States, it was the top-grossing new video game on the RePlay arcade charts in November 1991. In Australia, it was the top-grossing arcade conversion kit on the Timezone charts in November 1991.

The November 1991 issue of Sinclair User gave it the shared award for "Games Most Likely To Save The Universe" as one of the best superhero games, along with Captain America and The Avengers and Captain Commando.

The game was reviewed in 1992 in Dragon #177 by Hartley, Patricia, and Kirk Lesser in "The Role of Computers" column. The reviewers gave the game 5 out of 5 stars.

The January 1992 issue of Computer and Video Games gave it a positive review, praising the four-player gameplay, the "incredible graphics" with "huge, beautifully animated sprites and an impressive zoom in/zoom out effect" and the "16 different stages" with "enough to keep you pumping in the credits".

See also 
 List of Spider-Man video games

Notes

References

External links 
 

1991 video games
Arcade video games
Arcade-only video games
Cooperative video games
Fighting games
Sega arcade games
Sega beat 'em ups
Sega System 32 games
Video games based on Spider-Man
Video games developed in Japan
Video games set in Europe
Video games set in New York City
Side-scrolling beat 'em ups
Superhero video games